The seventh season of the Russian reality talent show The Voice, that was called "Reloading", premiered on October 12, 2018 on Channel One. Dmitry Nagiev returned as the show's presenter. On August 22, 2018, Channel One announced that Basta, Ani Lorak, Sergey Shnurov, and Konstantin Meladze became the coaches.

Petr Zakharov was named winner of the season. With his victory, Konstantin Meladze became the second new coach to win on his first season, behind Grigory Leps.

Coaches and presenter

On August 22, 2018, Channel One announced the names of the coaches. Basta replaced Dima Bilan and returned for his 2nd season as a coach after a two season-break. Ani Lorak, Sergey Shnurov, and Konstantin Meladze replaced Pelageya, Alexander Gradsky, and Leonid Agutin as new coaches for the show.

Dmitry Nagiyev returned for his 7th season as a presenter.

Teams
Colour key

Blind auditions
A new feature this season is The Best coach of the season (also in each episode).
Colour key

The coaches performed "Live is Life" at the start of the show.

The Battles
The Battle Rounds started on November 23. For the second time in the series' history the coaches can't steal two losing artists from other coaches. Contestants who win their battle will advance to the Knockout rounds.

Colour key

The Knockouts
The Knockout Rounds started on December 7. Each coach pairs three artists into one knockout with only one contestant from the trio advances to the next round. But the coaches for the first time in the show's history on this stage can steal one losing artist from another coach. The top 12 contestants will then move on to the Quarterfinal.

Colour key

Live shows
Colour key:

Week 1: Top 12 — Quarterfinal (December 21)
The Live Top 12 Quarterfinal comprised episode 11. The top twelve artists performed, with two artists from each team advancing based on the sum of the viewers' and coach's votes.

Week 2: Top 8 — Semifinal (December 28)
The top eight artists performed on December 28, 2018, with one artist from each team advancing to the Final based on the sum of the viewers' and coach's votes.

Week 3: Final (January 1)
The Top 4 artists performed on January 1, 2019. This week, the four finalists performed two solo cover songs and a duet with their coach.

Best Coach
Colour key

Reception

Rating

Notes

References

The Voice (Russian TV series)
2018 Russian television seasons
2019 Russian television seasons